Jotapian (died c. 249) was a usurper in the eastern provinces of the Roman Empire during the reign of Emperor Philip the Arab, around 249. Jotapian is known from his rare coins and from accounts in Aurelius Victor (Caesares xxix.2), Zosimus (i.20.2 and i.21.2), and Polemius Silvius (Laterculus).

Life

Origins
Jotapian was a member of the Near East indigenous aristocracy. His name is similar to those of Queen Julia Iotapa and her daughter, princess Julia Jotapa of the Kingdom of Commagene, so he could have been a member of the Royal Family of Commagene, which had lost its power in favour of the Romans under Emperor Vespasian in 72.

Aurelius Victor reports that Jotapian claimed descendance from an Alexander. According to some scholars, he referred to Alexander Severus, while other scholars note that King Antiochus I Theos of Commagene claimed descendance from Greek King Alexander the Great. He could be a possible descendant of Gaius Julius Agrippa or his brother Gaius Julius Alexander Berenicianus or his sister Julia Iotapa.

Revolt and death
Jotapian led a rebellion started in Syria, towards the end of Philip's rule, against the increase in taxation ordered by the rector Orientis Priscus, Philip's brother. It is possible that Philip somehow favoured his Arabia over the other Eastern provinces, since his rule was not quietly accepted by the local population. Jotapian made Antioch his capital, but the rebellion came to an end and Jotapian was killed by his own soldiers, possibly during Emperor Decius' rule.

Coinage
Coins issued by Jotapian had been found. All of them are antoniniani, all of them show a crude design, and all of them have a VICTORIA AVG reverse, celebrating a victory of the rebels over Philip troops or rather "the power of the Emperor to conquer" (Roman Imperial Coins, 4.3). It has been suggested that Jotapian also issued Aureus, none of which are known to have survived.

The coins are the only source for his names, M. F. RV., which could be expanded as Marcus Fulvius Rufus. Furthermore, their style suggest that the revolt was short and spread over a small territory, since Jotapian controlled no major mint.

References

Meckler, Michael and Christian Körner, "Jotapianus", s.v. "Philip the Arab and Rival Claimants of the later 240s", in DIR (1999).

249 deaths
3rd-century Roman usurpers
Year of birth unknown
Fulvii